Bulgaria has participated in the Turkvision Song Contest twice since their debut in the  contest, held in Kazan, Tatarstan. Bulgarian broadcaster Alfa Media (AMTV) organised the Bulgarian entry in its debut year. In 2014, Bulgaria's first entry at Turkvision was İsmail Matev.

History

On 31 October 2014 it was confirmed that Bulgaria would make their official debut at the 2014 Song Contest to be held in Kazan, Tatarstan. It was announced that İsmail Matev would represent Bulgaria at the contest in Kazan, the song that İsmail would sing in the contest was not known until the semi final on 19 November 2014. In the semi final Bulgaria were originally announced as failing to qualify for the final after finishing in thirteenth place. It later emerged that the scores for Turkmenistan and Bosnia and Herzegovina were incorrectly calculated. The organisers announced on 20 November 2014 that Bulgaria had qualified for the final in eleventh place with 168 points. In the final Bulgaria performed tenth after Yakutia and before Azerbaijan, they finished in eleventh place with a total of 172 points.

Participation overview

See also 
 Bulgaria in the Junior Eurovision Song Contest
 Bulgaria in the Eurovision Song Contest

References

Turkvision
Countries in the Turkvision Song Contest
+